Pfäffikon District is one of the twelve districts of the German-speaking canton of Zürich, Switzerland. Its capital is the town of Pfäffikon.

Municipalities 
Pfäffikon contains a total of ten municipalities:

Mergers and name changes
On 1 January 2015 the former municipalities of Sternenberg and Bauma merged to form the new municipality of Bauma with a new SFOS number.
On 1 January 2016 the municipality Kyburg merged into Illnau-Effretikon.

See also 
Municipalities of the canton of Zürich

References

Districts of the canton of Zürich
Pfäffikon, Zürich